Solapur South is a taluka in Solapur subdivision of Solapur District of Maharashtra in India.

References

Cities and towns in Sangli district
Talukas in Maharashtra